Lueg is a surname. Notable people with the surname include:

 Ernst-Dieter Lueg (1930–2000), German writer and television journalist
 Werner Lueg (1931–2014), German runner

See also
 Luer